Medlerana is a genus of moths of the family Noctuidae.

Species
Medlerana bukobaenensis Laporte, 1979  (from Tanzania)
Medlerana nigeriensis Laporte, 1979 (from Nigeria)

References
afromoths
(in French) Laporte, 1979. Descriptions de nouvelles espèces de Noctuelles de l'Afrique (Lepidoptera, Noctuidae). Spixiana 2(2).105-112 (at: Landesmuseum.at)

Noctuinae